Izabela Tomaszewska, née Głowacka (13 September 1955 in Kwidzyn – 10 April 2010) was a Polish government official and archaeologist. She was head of the Protocolar Unit at the Chancellery of the President of the Republic of Poland.

She co-edited the journal Archeologia Polski for nine volumes between 1990 and 1998.

She died in the 2010 Polish Air Force Tu-154 crash near Smolensk on 10 April 2010. She was posthumously awarded the Order of Polonia Restituta.

References

1955 births
2010 deaths
University of Warsaw alumni
Officers of the Order of Polonia Restituta
Burials at Powązki Military Cemetery
Victims of the Smolensk air disaster
People from Kwidzyn
20th-century Polish archaeologists
Polish women archaeologists